Forte Real de São Filipe is a 16th century fortress in the city of Cidade Velha in the south of the island of Santiago, Cape Verde. It is located on a plateau above the town centre, 120 meters above sea level. The historic centre of Cidade Velha is an UNESCO World Heritage Site since June 2009. The fort was part of a system of defence for the city, which also included six smaller forts on the coast and a wall along the port.

History
The fortress was built under Philip I of Portugal between 1587 and 1593, little after Sir Francis Drake's 1585 raid of Santiago. It completed the existing defence system, consisting of the older forts of São Lourenço, São Brás, Presidio, São Veríssimo, São João dos Cavaleiros and São António. Remains of these forts can still be seen. The Forte Real de São Filipe was built from stone imported from Portugal. It was designed by the military engineers João Nunes and Filippo Terzi. The fort has been restored in 1999-2001.

Layout
The fortress consists of three bastions towards the interior of the island (east). Towards the north and south it is protected by a steep cliff. Access is from the west. Inside the fortress were military storage facilities, a brick cistern, the residence of the Governor, the garrison, the prison and the chapel of São Gonçalo.

Gallery

See also
Portuguese Empire
List of World Heritage Sites in Africa
List of buildings and structures in Santiago, Cape Verde

References

External links

As Maravilhas de Portugal no Mundo: Cidade Velha de Santiago 
Drawing of Forte de São Lourenço in Arquipélagos.pt

Ribeira Grande de Santiago
Buildings and structures completed in 1590
Buildings and structures in Santiago, Cape Verde
1590 establishments in Cape Verde
Portuguese colonial architecture in Cape Verde